Regional School District 16 is a school district made up of the towns of Beacon Falls and Prospect in New Haven County, Connecticut. It is currently run by Superintendent of Schools Michael Yamin.

History 
In 2014, the district rolled out plans for a three-part construction project that would take place over the following years: renovations to Laurel Ledge, a new elementary school for Prospect students, and a new district office.

At the closing of the 2014–2015 school year, construction of Prospect Elementary School was completed. Algonquin School, which previously held students grades K-3, was demolished shortly afterwards, with a new district office built on site.

Beginning with the 2016–2017 school year, the district rolled out plans for a 1:1 initiative, which allocates a Chromebook to every student at Woodland Regional High School.

Prospect BoE Members 
Mr. Robert Hiscox - BOE Chair (2013-2017)Member: Personnel and Negotiations Committee

Ms. Daisy Laone (2015-2019) Member: Wellness Committee, Professional Development Committee, Curriculum Committee, Technology Committee

Mr. Nazih Noujaim (2013-2017) Chair: Technology Committee  Member: Facilities and Transportation Committee, Policy Committee

Ms. Roxann Vaillancourt (2015-2019) Chair:Public Communications Committee, Policy Committee Member: Curriculum Committee,

Beacon Falls BoE Members 
Mrs. Priscilla Cretella BOE Vice-Chair (2015-2019) Chair: Personnel and Negotiations Committee Member: Facilities and Transportation Committee, Public Communications Committee

Mrs. Christine Arnold (2013-2017) Chair:Recognition Committee Member: Personnel and NegotiationsCommittee, Policy Committee

Mr. Erik Dey (2017-2021) Chair: Curriculum Committee Member: Technology Committee, Professional Development Committee

Mr. David Rybinski (2015-2019) Chair: Facilities and Transportation Committee, Public Communications Committee

Schools 
 Laurel Ledge Elementary School
 Prospect Elementary School
 Long River Middle School
 Woodland Regional High School

Former Schools 
 Algonquin School
 Community School

References

External links
 

Education in New Haven County, Connecticut
School districts in Connecticut
Beacon Falls, Connecticut
Prospect, Connecticut